Valentin Claireaux (born April 5, 1991) is a French ice hockey player for PSG Zlín and the French national team. He participated at the 2015 IIHF World Championship and the 2018 IIHF World Championship.

References

External links

1991 births
Living people
French ice hockey forwards
People from Saint Pierre and Miquelon
Lukko players
Vaasan Sport players